The Long Island Nets are an American professional basketball team in the NBA G League based in Uniondale, New York, and are affiliated with the Brooklyn Nets. The team plays its home games at the Nassau Veterans Memorial Coliseum in Nassau County, New York. The Nets became the twelfth Development League team to be owned by an NBA team when it was announced in 2015.

History 
In June 2015, the Brooklyn Nets announced their intentions to purchase a D-League affiliate. The team announced on November 5, 2015, that they reached an agreement for their new D-League team, called the Long Island Nets, to play in a renovated Nassau Veterans Memorial Coliseum, which was the home of the Nets during their ABA years. However, due to renovations, the new team played in their parent team's home, Barclays Center, for their first season.

On March 24, 2016, the Nets hired Alton Byrd as the vice president of business operations. On April 15, 2016, Ronald Nored was hired as the team's head coach and on August 23, 2016, Ryan Gomes and Pat Rafferty were announced as assistant coaches. On November 12, 2016, the Nets won their first game after defeating the Canton Charge 120–118.

Season-by-season

Current roster

Head coaches

NBA affiliates
 Brooklyn Nets (2016–present)

References

External links
 

 
2015 establishments in New York (state)
Basketball teams established in 2015
Basketball teams in the New York metropolitan area
Basketball teams in New York (state)
Brooklyn Nets
Sports in Hempstead, New York